Conor Ramsay (born 9 March 1993) is a Scottish professional footballer who plays for Arthurlie in the Scottish Junior Football Association, West Region. He is a former Scotland youth international and has previously played in the Scottish Premier League for St Mirren.

Career
A midfielder, Ramsay started his career with hometown team St Mirren. He made five appearances in the Scottish Premier League under the management of Gus MacPherson at the age of sixteen while also featuring for the Scotland U17 international team. Injury restricted his progress at St Mirren and Ramsay moved to rivals Greenock Morton in July 2011.

After his release by Morton in May 2012, Ramsay joined Junior side Johnstone Burgh before moving on to Arthurlie in July 2013.

He is now involved with former club St Mirren as a community development officer.

Career statistics

References

External links

1993 births
Living people
Scottish footballers
St Mirren F.C. players
Greenock Morton F.C. players
Johnstone Burgh F.C. players
Arthurlie F.C. players
Scottish Premier League players
Footballers from Paisley, Renfrewshire
Scottish Football League players
Scottish Junior Football Association players
Scotland youth international footballers
Association football midfielders